is a former Japanese football player.

Playing career
Kimori was born in Saitama Prefecture on July 28, 1977. After graduating from Senshu University, he joined the J2 League club Shonan Bellmare in 2000. He played in many matches as midfielder during his first season. However he did not play in any games in 2002. In 2003, he moved to the J2 club Mito HollyHock. He became a regular player as an attacking midfielder and played often over two seasons. In 2005, he moved to the newly promoted J2 club, Thespa Kusatsu. He played often as a regular forward. In 2006, he moved to the Prefectural Leagues club Tonan SC Gunma (later Tonan Maebashi). He retired at the end of the 2008 season.

Club statistics

References

External links

1977 births
Living people
Senshu University alumni
Association football people from Saitama Prefecture
Japanese footballers
J2 League players
Shonan Bellmare players
Mito HollyHock players
Thespakusatsu Gunma players
Association football forwards